Doctor Chakravarthy is 1964 Telugu-language drama film, produced by D. Madhusudhana Rao under the Annapurna Pictures banner and directed by Adurthi Subba Rao. It stars Akkineni Nageswara Rao, Savitri and Jaggayya, with music composed by S. Rajeswara Rao. The film is based on Koduri Kousalya Devi's novel Chakrabhramanam. The film was recorded as an industry hit at the box office. It is the first film to win the Nandi Award, instituted by Government of Andhra Pradesh in 1964. It inspired many people in India to become doctors.

Plot
Dr. Chakravarthy arrives from abroad and plans to marry his lady love Dr. Sridevi. He has an affectionate sister, Sudha. Chakravarthy is extremely fond of his sister. Sudha is a great musician and loves writing poetry and she marries a loving person. However, by the time Chakravarthy returns to his hometown, his sister is terribly ill and in the last stages of her life. Chakravarthy gets distraught to know that his sister has cancer. Sudha requests Chakravarthy to marry her sister-in-law Nirmala as a dying wish. Chakravarthy doesn't get a chance to tell that he has already loved a woman in life. He suppresses the sadness and marries Nirmala as per his sister's wish. Nirmala is a materialistic person who loves going around for picnics, shopping and doesn't understand the artistic subtleties in life. Chakravarthy is a busy doctor with nonstop work dealing with patients, treatment and tests. He has nothing in common with Nirmala and their life goes on in a mechanical way, despite staying under one roof. The story makes a turn when Chakravarthy meets Ravindra and his wife Madhavi. Madhavi is a great veena player and writes poetry exactly like Chakravarthy's lost sister Sudha. Chakravathy starts feeling that his sister has returned in the form of Madhavi. He feels relief in visiting their house and speaking to Madhavi so that it's like speaking to his own sister. Though Madhavi finds Chakravarthy's behavior a little odd in the beginning, her husband convinces her, saying Chakravarthy is a very good gentleman.

Meanwhile, Nirmala despises the affection of Chakravarthy towards Madhavi's family. On the ill advice of the cook, Nirmala writes a secret letter to Ravindra by wrongly quoting the friendship of Chakravarthy and Madhavi. Ravindra starts believing the cooked up story and hates Chakravarthy. He insults Madhavi without even considering that the latter is pregnant and in a weakened condition. As the story reaches its climax, Ravindra realizes that Chakravarthy only had brotherly affection, but nothing else on Madhavi. Nirmala realizes her mistake of writing such a letter. Ravindra realizes his blunder and even names his newborn son after Chakravarthy.

Cast

Crew
Art: G. V. Subba Rao
Choreography: Hiralal, Pasumarthi 
Lyrics: Aatreya, Arudra, Sri Sri, Dasarathi, Kosaraju
Story: Koduri Kousalya Devi 
Dialogues: Gollapudi Maruthi Rao, Aatreya 
Music: S. Rajeswara Rao
Play-back: Ghantasala, P. Susheela, S. Janaki, P. B. Srinivas, Madhavapeddi Satyam, Vasantha
Cinematography: P. S.  Selvaraj
Editing: T. Krishna 
Assistant Director: K. Viswanath
Producer: D. Madhusudhana Rao
Director: Adurthi Subba Rao
Banner: Annapurna Pictures
Release Date: 10 July 1964

Soundtrack

Awards
 National Film Award for Best Feature Film in Telugu - 1964
 Nandi Award for Best Feature Film - Gold - 1964

References

External links
 

1964 films
1960s Telugu-language films
Indian drama films
Films based on Indian novels
Nandi Award winners
1964 drama films
Films directed by Adurthi Subba Rao
Best Telugu Feature Film National Film Award winners